Dmytro Stoyko (born 3 February 1975) is a retired Ukrainian football goalkeeper.

External links
 Official Website Profile

1975 births
Living people
Ukrainian footballers
Association football goalkeepers
FC Zirka Kropyvnytskyi players
FC Vorskla Poltava players
FC Kharkiv players
Ukrainian Premier League players